Sangli-Miraj & Kupwad is urban agglomeration and a municipal corporation in Sangli district in the Indian state of Maharashtra.

Urban areas 
The City includes, three nearby urban areas

 Sangli is situated on the banks of river Krishna. 
 Miraj is a railway junction, a major healthcare centre and an export hub of classical Indian musical instruments. Famous hospitals like Wanless Hospital, Krupamayi Mental Hospital and Richardson Leprosy Hospitals are based in Miraj. Government Medical College, Miraj is also located in Miraj.
 Kupwad, formerly a small town, now mainly houses the MIDC industrial area. Kupwad MIDC is an industrial area harbouring many foundries, spinning mills, chocolate factories, oil manufacturing, cold storage etc. Notable foundries are Tulsi foundry, J sons foundry. Notable spinning mills like Toto Toya spin ltd. Oil manufacturing factory (Chakan oil mills). Kupwad town has an Employees' State Insurance Hospital (ESIS Hospital) for the Insured persons and their family who are working in Kupwad MIDC area.
 Madhavnagar

Governance
The Sangli Miraj Kupwad Municipal Corporation is the governing body of the metropolitan area of Sangli Miraj Kupwad. The municipal corporation consists of democratically elected members, is headed by a mayor and administers the city's infrastructure, public services and police. Members from the state's leading various political parties hold elected offices in the corporation. The Sangli Miraj Kupwad Municipal Corporation was created on 28 February 1998 by the merger of the previously separate municipal councils of Sangli, Miraj and Kupwad. Sangli had been the district administrative centre and Miraj and Kupwad were small towns located within 10-km distance from Sangli.

Demographics
 India census, Sangli-Miraj-Kupwad had a population of over a half million as per 2011 census. Males constitute 51% of the population and females 49%. Sangli-Miraj-Kupwad has an average literacy rate of 77%, higher than the national average of 59.5%: male literacy is 81%, and female literacy is 69%. In Sangli-Miraj-Kupwad, 12% of the population is under 6 years of age. In Kupwad, as described by Gumperz and Wilson in 1971, Kannada speaking Jains and Lingayats formed the majority, while the rest consisted of Marathi speaking Dalits, Urdu speaking Muslims and a few Telugu speaking rope-makers. In Miraj Urdu speaking Muslims form a majority of 50% of total population of the city.

References

Cities and towns in Sangli district
Cities in Maharashtra